The El Bosque Open was a professional golf tournament on the European Tour. It was held just once, in 1990, when it replaced the Jersey Open on the tour schedule. Its renewal in 1991 was cancelled due to lack of sponsorship.

The tournament was played on the Robert Trent Jones designed course at El Bosque Golf & Country Club, Valencia, Spain from 5–8 April and was won by Vijay Singh of Fiji, who later become the World's Number 1 golfer. It was Singh's second title on the European Tour and he shot a ten under par of 278 to win by two strokes from the Englishmen Richard Boxall and Chris Williams.

Winners

References

External links
Official scores and prize money - the amounts shown are stated to be in euro, but it is more likely that they are in British pounds, which was the official currency of the tour at that time, and that the £ sign has incorrectly been replaced with the € sign. The annual schedule states the total prize implied by the breakdown was in pounds.

Former European Tour events
Golf tournaments in Spain
Sports competitions in Valencia